DPRC may refer to:

 Daytime passive radiative cooling, a solar radiation management strategy for global warming
 District of the People's Republic of China, a Chinese administrative division
 Democratic People's Republic of Choson, an alternative name of North Korea
 Demobilized Personnel Records Center, a former US Army facility